The Three Troubledoers is a 1946 short subject directed by Edward Bernds starring American slapstick comedy team The Three Stooges (Moe Howard, Larry Fine and Curly Howard). It is the 91st entry in the series released by Columbia Pictures starring the comedians, who released 190 shorts for the studio between 1934 and 1959

Plot
The Stooges are cowboys who come upon the town of Dead Man's Gulch, which is being terrorized by Badlands Blackie (Dick Curtis) and his gang. Blackie threatens to kill the town blacksmith unless his daughter Nell (Christine McIntyre) agrees to marry him. After an impromptu battle with Blackie the locals crown Curly their new sheriff, and Moe and Larry deputies. Nell then agrees to marry Curly if he rids the town of Blackie.

On his way to make the marriage legit, the Justice of the Peace (Victor Travers) is accosted by the Stooges and Curly heads to his office in his place. He attempts to stall the wedding, but is eventually found out and is locked up like a dog, complete with collar strapped tightly around his neck. As a result, Blackie again demands Nell marry him immediately and away from Dead Man's Gulch. Nell promises to arrive by sundown.

After breaking Curly free, the trio crash the wedding and defeat Blackie and his gang. Nell's father is freed, and upon learning that Nell plans to marry Curly due to his efforts, claims that he'd "rather die" first. Curly, obliging, hands him a lit stick of dynamite, but Nell knocks it out of his hands and throws it at the boys, who turn high tail and run off.

Production notes
The Three Troubledoers was filmed on May 11–15, 1945, nearly a year prior to its release date. It was the last western-themed short starring Curly Howard and the tenth of sixteen Stooge shorts with the word "three" in the title.

Curly's illness
The Three Troubledoers was produced after Curly Howard suffered a mild stroke. As a result, his performance was marred by slurred speech, and slower timing. Though Curly's falsetto voice had deepened slightly by this point, the ailing star was comfortable enough to deliver his dialogue in his regular speaking voice. Director Edward Bernds later recalled how Curly's condition would have its peaks and valleys:

Moe's injury
The script for The Three Troubledoers called for a gag in which a bazooka gun was to backfire and shoot black soot into Moe's face. "The special effects man used too much air pressure," says director Edward Bernds, "so some of the soot shot up under his [Moe] eyelids. They had to pry his eyes open and remove these big chunks of black powder from his eye. I was terrified; I thought the poor guy had been blinded." Moe had a similar ordeal while filming 1939's Oily to Bed, Oily to Rise, when gobs of black goo (representing oil) shot under his eyelids.

References

External links 
 
 
The Three Troubledoers at threestooges.net

1946 films
The Three Stooges films
American black-and-white films
1940s Western (genre) comedy films
Columbia Pictures short films
Films directed by Edward Bernds
American Western (genre) comedy films
1946 comedy films
1940s English-language films
1940s American films